Aughinish is a former island (now peninsula) in the Shannon estuary, in County Limerick, Ireland, near Foynes.

Rusal Aughinish, Europe's largest bauxite refinery, is located on the island. The site includes a deep-water jetty in the Shannon through which the refinery imports bauxite from Guinea and Brazil and exports alumina to be refined into aluminium metal.

Although most of the island is occupied by industry, it is also the site of Ireland's first butterfly sanctuary, located in an abandoned quarry.

References

Islands of County Limerick
River Shannon